Gerendás is a village in Békés County, in the Southern Great Plain region of south-east Hungary. The nearest city is Csorvás.

It covers an area of 40.78 km2 and has a population of 1576 people (2002).

References

Populated places in Békés County